Thomas Paladino (born April 17, 1985), known professionally as Daringer, is an American record producer and a member of the musical collective Griselda. Daringer has been producing since 2005. He is named after the Daringer pistol, also called Derringer.

Musical style 
His style of production is considered dark and gritty, matching Griselda's Mafioso rap themes involving members' experience with gang violence and cocaine. The style is reminiscent of East Coast hip-hop of the 20th century, bringing back boom-bap of golden age hip-hop and old school hip-hop and he frequently uses sampling in his hip-hop instrumentals (with the exception of WWCD). His music is also influenced by jazz rap due to his parents being jazz musicians.

Discography

References 

American record producers
Hip hop record producers
Living people
1985 births